Lawrence Heyworth Jr. (February 10, 1921 – May 4, 2003) was a rear admiral in the United States Navy. He was superintendent of the United States Naval Academy in Annapolis, Maryland, from June 22 to July 20, 1968. He was a 1943 graduate of the Naval Academy. He was one of the 32 finalists for NASA Astronaut Group 1 in 1959, but ultimately was not selected.

References

1921 births
2003 deaths
United States Navy personnel of World War II
Recipients of the Legion of Merit
Recipients of the Navy and Marine Corps Medal
Superintendents of the United States Naval Academy
United States Navy admirals
20th-century American academics